Maffey is a surname. Notable people with the surname include:

Penelope Loader Maffey (1910–2005), English socialite
John Maffey (disambiguation), multiple people

See also
Maffei
Maffeo